Rougemont is a village and commune in the Doubs department in the Bourgogne-Franche-Comté region in eastern France.

Population

See also
 Communes of the Doubs department

References

External links

 Rougemont on the regional Web site 
 Official Web site

Communes of Doubs